Larissa Chouaib (born November 1st, 1966) is a Ukrainian-Lebanese Olympic table tennis player and Arab World Table Tennis Champion. She represented Lebanon in 1996 Summer Olympics in Atlanta, where she lost all three of her matchs. She studied Sport Education in Kyiv from 1984 to 1989 when she had a Master's degree in the same field. In 2001, she started her coaching career in Table tennis in Lebanon.

Olympic participation

Atlanta 1996
Chouaib was the only participant for Lebanon in that tournament.
Table tennis – Women's Singles – Preliminary Round

Personal life
Larissa Chouaib married her college classmate Yahia, and they have a son.

References

1966 births
Living people
Table tennis players at the 1996 Summer Olympics
Lebanese female table tennis players
Olympic table tennis players of Lebanon